Saint-Quentin-sur-Charente (Limousin: Sent Quentin) is a commune in the Charente department in Nouvelle-Aquitaine, southwestern France.

Location and access
Saint-Quentin-sur-Charente, called Saint-Quentin locally, is part of the canton of Charente-Vienne. It lies on the upper course of the river Charente. The nearest larger towns are Chabanais ( to the northeast), Rochechouart ( to the east) and Confolens ( to the north). It is served by several small country roads. The D161 and the D190 serve the town. The D164 passes just north of the town. The nearest train station is in Chabanais, served by TER.

Population

See also
 Rochechouart impact structure
Communes of the Charente department

References

Communes of Charente